Earthly Possessions is a 1999 American made-for-television romantic drama film starring Susan Sarandon and Stephen Dorff. The film originally premiered on HBO on March 20, 1999.

Plot
An adaptation of Anne Tyler's novel of the same name about a middle aged housewife who feels her life is going nowhere, Charlotte Emory, plans to withdraw all the money from her bank account and leave her husband, a minister who has been taking her for granted for years. Then a young bank robber, Jake Sims, grabs her at gunpoint, takes her hostage and they make their getaway on a bus.

References

External links
 
 

1999 television films
1999 films
American romantic drama films
1990s English-language films
Films based on American novels
Films directed by James Lapine
1999 romantic drama films
HBO Films films
American drama television films
1990s American films